Huitaca or Xubchasgagua was a rebelling goddess in the religion of the Muisca. The Muisca and their confederation were a civilization who inhabited the Altiplano Cundiboyacense in the Andes. Huitaca has been described by the chroniclers Juan de Castellanos in his Elegías de varones ilustres de Indias, Lucas Fernández de Piedrahita and Pedro Simón.

Spellings and names

Description 
Huitaca was the goddess of arts, dance and music, witchcraft, sexual liberation and the Moon.
According to the Muisca legends Huitaca was a goddess of extreme beauty who praised a life full of joy, games, pleasure and drunkenness who was rebelling against the patriarchal Bochica upon which he turned her into a white owl.

Some chroniclers state Huitaca was another name for Moon goddess Chía or Bachué, mother goddess of the Muisca.

Huitaca in modern art 
Sculptor Julia Merizalde Price has made a sculpture honouring Huitaca, picturing her after the curse of Bochica.Photographer Carlos Saavedra has made an exposition showing different indigenous women of Colombia in his search for Huitaca.

Named after Huitaca 
 Huitaca, a genus of Opiliones
 Huitaca boyacaensis, a species in this genus, species name derived from Boyacá, former Muisca territory
 Huitaca ventralis, the type species of the genus Huitaca
 Huitaca bitaco
 Huitaca caldas
 Huitaca depressa
 Huitaca sharkeyi
 Huitaca tama

See also 
Muisca women
List of lunar deities

References

Bibliography 
 
 

Muisca goddesses
Sky and weather goddesses
Arts goddesses
Love and lust goddesses
Mythological birds of prey
Huitaca
Lunar goddesses
Magic goddesses